North Kingston is a community in the Canadian province of Nova Scotia, located in Kings County, at the foot of the North Mountain. The community is 3 km from the village of Kingston, although that is not its namesake, but rather the original Kingston Village, which is now known as Greenwood.

References

  North Kingston on Destination Nova Scotia

Communities in Kings County, Nova Scotia
General Service Areas in Nova Scotia